The Love Machine is an album released by singer/comedian/actress Sandra Bernhard. The album is a live recording of her one-woman show of the same title; it combines comedic monologues and musical performances. It was primarily sold at her live shows until it was made available on her official website.

In the performance Bernhard does what she is best known for: she rips apart celebrity culture while commenting on events of the time. Among the topics she addresses: the program Queer as Folk, Rosie O'Donnell, religion and high fashion. Comedian Roseanne Barr makes a guest appearance.

The recording is notoriously unpopular with fans due to the low production quality; it is muffled and low quality.

Track listing
Across 110th Street
Disastrous Trips to Scotland and Other Far Off Lands with the Lady and Bush
Kick Off Your Manolo Blahniks
Burberry Bitches
Downtown Train
The Saga of Channel 35 Public Access
Good Day to Die
Modern Feminism
Get it While We Can
Shabbat in the City
Seussical and the Saga of Rosie
Cruiselines and 99 cent Stores
Shock of the New
Queer as Folk
Nikki Doesn’t Call Me Anymore
A Few of my Favorite Nail Salons
You Shook Me All Night Long, with Roseanne
Salt of the Earth
Encore: Little Red Corvette

Sandra Bernhard albums
2001 live albums
2000s comedy albums